Stroudsburg Area School District is a large, suburban/rural public school district located in the Poconos of northeast Pennsylvania. The headquarters are located on West Main Street in the Borough of Stroudsburg in Monroe County. According to 2000 federal census data, it served a resident population of 30,713
. By 2010, the district's population increased to 36,502 people, by 2015 it had declined to 35,787. In 2009, the district residents' per capita income was $22,137, while the median family income was $56,546. In the Commonwealth, the median family income was $49,501 and the United States median family income was $49,445, in 2010. The district is one of the 500 public school districts of Pennsylvania.

According to the Pennsylvania Budget and Policy Center, 44.1% of the district's pupils lived at 185% or below the Federal Poverty Level as shown by their eligibility for the federal free or reduced price school meal programs in 2012. In 2013 the Pennsylvania Department of Education, reported that 60 students in the Stroudsburg Area School District were homeless.

Per District officials, in school year 2007-08 the Stroudsburg Area School District provided basic educational services to 5,906 pupils through the employment of 426 teachers, 364 full-time and part-time support personnel, and 24 administrators. Stroudsburg Area School District received more than $18.9 million in state funding in school year 2007–08. The superintendent of schools was Dr. John A. Toleno. In school year 2009–10, Stroudsburg Area School District provided basic educational services to 5,641 pupils. It employed: 415 teachers, 362 full-time and part-time support personnel, and 25 administrators. Stroudsburg Area School District received more than $21.3 million in state funding in school year 2009–10. In February 2017, Superintendent Cosmas Curry reported the district employed 379 classroom teachers and student enrollment was 5,087 students.

Schools
The Stroudsburg Area School District consists of five elementary schools, an intermediate elementary school, a middle school, a junior high, and a high school. There are four elementary principals as well as one at each
of the other four school buildings. The intermediate school has one assistant principal, junior high 1.5 assistant principals, and the high school has three assistant principals.

B.F. Morey Elementary
Hamilton Township Elementary
Arlington Heights Elementary
Chipperfield Elementary School
Stroudsburg Middle School
Stroudsburg Junior High School
Stroudsburg High School

Stroudsburg High School students may choose to attend Monroe Career & Tech Institute for training in the trades. The Colonial Intermediate Unit IU20 provides the district with a wide variety of services like specialized education for disabled students and hearing, speech and visual disability services and professional development for staff and faculty.

W.H. Ramsey Elementary was closed by the school board due to declining enrollment district-wide, effective June 2014, followed by Clearview Elementary the following year.

Extracurriculars

Sports
The district funds:
Varsity

Boys
Baseball - AAAA
Basketball- AAAA
Cross country - AAA
Football - AAAA
Golf - AAA
Rifle - AAAA
Soccer - AAA
Swimming and diving - AAA
Tennis - AAA
Track and field - AAA
Wrestling - AAA

Girls
Basketball - AAAA
Cheer - AAAA
Cross country - AAA
Field hockey - AAA
Rifle - AAA
Soccer - AAA
Softball - AAAA
Swimming and diving - AAA
Tennis - AAA
Track and field - AAA
Volleyball - AAA

Junior high middle school sports

Boys
Basketball
Football
Soccer
Wrestling 

Girls
Basketball
Field hockey
Softball 
Soccer

According to PIAA directory July 2013

References

External links
 

Pocono Mountains
School districts in Monroe County, Pennsylvania